May Bukas Pa (lit. There Is Still Tomorrow) is a Philippine television series aired by IBC from April 24 to September 28, 2000, and transferred to RPN from October 2, 2000, to May 4, 2001, and produced by Viva Television. It stars Dina Bonnevie, Albert Martinez and Cherie Gil. The show was aired on a 6:00pm timeslot during Mondays, Tuesdays, and Thursdays on IBC, and then on weekdays at 6:30-7:00pm when it moved on RPN.

The soap is also an Afternoon program part of Viva TV's line-up.

It was revealed that the show would be revived on ABS-CBN from February 2, 2009 to February 5, 2010, with the revival series was produced by the network's Dreamscape Entertainment.

Plot
Sofia's husband Rico, was a drunk and a bum and didn't work to support the family. This is why Sofia had to work in place of her husband just to make ends meet. In spite of this, Sofia's husband was able to accuse her of adultery and took off with their only daughter, Milagros. Sofia then, went after her husband but before being able to confront him, the husband was run over by a bus.

Not to be dismayed, Sofia went off to Manila in search for her lost child. Little did she know that her daughter was adopted by a famous actress named Divina Miguel whose motives for the child was a political move to increase hype for her new movie.

Sofia, having been gifted with an angelic voice, was discovered by a talent manager and eventually became a famous singer-actress. The point came where Sofia's popularity overshadowed Divina's and to make things worst, Ramon, Divina's love team, tied the knot with Sofia and left Divina. This made Divina Miguel furious and from then on considered Sofia as her mortal enemy. 
Dreading Sofia for taking away everything from her, Divina directed her anger towards her poor adopted child Bea (Milagros).

At times, Divina would think about her child that she gave away for her career. Divina was disowned by her aunt Donya Felisa when she became pregnant. What Divina doesn't know is that the child she gave away fell under the care of Delia (the maid of Donya Felisa). This child is Charie. Divina was maltreating Charie as she's just a maid's daughter, not knowing that it was her own child.

However, when Donya Felisa died, Divina would plot to acquire her aunt's wealth against Irene who is her aunt's adopted child and happens to be Sofia's long lost sister.

Cast

Main cast
Dina Bonnevie as Sofia Catacutan
Albert Martinez as Ramon Suarez
Cherie Gil as Divina Miguel
Celia Rodriguez as Conchita Suarez
Angelu de Leon as Irene Buencamino
Kim delos Santos as Charie Miguel
Anne Curtis as Bea Miguel
Michael Flores as Dennis Suarez
Bojo Molina as Marcus Paredes
Dino Guevarra as Ricky
Chubi del Rosario as Leslie

Supporting cast
Rosemarie Gil as Rodora Suarez
Aiza Marquez as Trina Suarez
Maui Taylor as Ruthy
Maureen Mauricio as Delia
Patricia Javier as Vivian Paredes
Ricardo Cepeda as Fidel
Vanna Garcia as Sharon
Jackie Castillejo as Carla
My-My Davao as Patty
Katya Santos as Tricia
Phillip Lazaro as Freddie
Leni Santos as Helen
Daniel Fernando as Rico Catacutan

Extended cast
Wendy Fernando as Mylene
Jacklyn Kate as Wendy
Polo Ravales as Michael
Ivan Gonzales as Andrei
Daria Ramirez as Belinda
Pocholo Montes as Delfin
Mike Lloren as Leo

Minor Cast/Special Participation
Marita Zobel as Doña Felisa
Ryan Eigenmann as Dave
Benjie Felipe as Kidnapper
Harlene Bautista as Annie

Staff
Directed by: Gil Tejada Jr.

Headwriter: RJ Nuevas

Writers: Suzette Doctolero, Patricia Valenzuela

Songs
May Bukas Pa by Wency Cornejo (main theme) - Originally performed by Rico J. Puno
Save This Heart by Lani Misalucha (closing theme)
Kung Wala Na by Jaya (closing theme)
Bakit Iniwan by Freestyle (closing theme)
Breathless by The Corrs - used by Girls can Sing (Anne Curtis, Aiza Marquez, Vanna Garcia, Maui Taylor) in the contest they joined

References

External links

May Bukas Pa
NEW TV SHOW: Hectic montage of births, adoptions launches 'May Bukas Pa'
CHERIE GIL IN RP FOR NEW TV SERIES
RICKY LO'S UPDATE ON CHERIE HILL

2000 Philippine television series debuts
2001 Philippine television series endings
2000s Philippine television series
Philippine drama television series
Radio Philippines Network original programming
Intercontinental Broadcasting Corporation original programming
Television series by Viva Television
Filipino-language television shows